Malaia is a commune in Vâlcea County, Oltenia, Romania. It is composed of three villages: Malaia, Ciungetu and Săliștea.

References

Communes in Vâlcea County
Localities in Oltenia